Gerrardina is a genus of two species of trees, shrubs, and scrambling shrubs found in southeastern Africa. Until recently, the genus was placed in the polyphyletic family Flacourtiaceae, but it was abnormal there due to its apical placentation, small embryos, and mucilaginous foliar epidermis. Analyses of DNA data indicated that the genus did not fit in any known plant family and not clearly in any then-recognized order, and a new family, Gerrardinaceae, was thus created for it. Later analyses of additional DNA data and data from wood anatomy  indicated that the family should be placed in the order Huerteales.

References

 http://www.mobot.org/MOBOT/Research/APweb/orders/huertealesweb.htm
 Tree of Life: Gerrardina

Flora of Africa
Huerteales
Rosid genera
Taxa named by Daniel Oliver